Lucie Lamarre is currently the Associate Chief Justice of the Tax Court of Canada.

References

Living people
Judges of the Tax Court of Canada
Canadian women judges
Year of birth missing (living people)